Nilton Soares Rodrigues (born 11 September 1993), commonly known as Niltinho, is a Brazilian footballer who plays for Super League Greece 2 club Panachaiki. Mainly a left winger, he can also play as a left back.

Club career
Niltinho signed for Daejeon Citizen in July 2015, and made his debut against Gwangju FC in a 2–1 win csa

Career statistics

Honours
Chapecoense
Campeonato Catarinense: 2017

References

External links

1993 births
Living people
Footballers from São Paulo
Brazilian footballers
Association football wingers
Campeonato Brasileiro Série A players
Campeonato Brasileiro Série B players
Campeonato Brasileiro Série C players
Associação Desportiva São Caetano players
União Agrícola Barbarense Futebol Clube players
Volta Redonda FC players
Joinville Esporte Clube players
Criciúma Esporte Clube players
Associação Chapecoense de Futebol players
Atlético Clube Goianiense players
K League 1 players
Daejeon Hana Citizen FC players
Primeira Liga players
G.D. Chaves players
Brazilian expatriate footballers
Brazilian expatriate sportspeople in South Korea
Brazilian expatriate sportspeople in Portugal
Expatriate footballers in South Korea
Expatriate footballers in Portugal